The Norfolk & Suffolk League was a football league covering the counties of Norfolk and Suffolk in England.

History
The league was established in 1897, starting with six clubs, Beccles Caxton, Great Yarmouth Town, Kirkley, Lowestoft Town, Lynn Town and Norwich CEYMS. Lowestoft won the inaugural league title and went on to win six of the first seven championships. By the early 1900s it had attracted the two biggest clubs in the region, Ipswich Town and Norwich City. The league gradually expanded, reaching 14 clubs in the 1920s and after a slight contraction, losing many of its better clubs to the newly established Eastern Counties League, it had sixteen members by the late 1930s. During the late 1950s it had 18 members. However, it had lost most of the Suffolk-based clubs and in 1964 the league merged with the East Anglian League to form the Anglian Combination.

Champions

Member clubs
Member clubs during the league's existence included: 

12th Lancers
16th Lancers
Beccles Caxton
Beccles Town
Boulton & Paul
Bungay Town
Bury Town
CNS Old Boy's Union
Carrow Works
City Wanderers
Cromer
Dereham Town
Diss Town
Eastern Coachworks
Eastern Counties United
Electricity Works
Fakenham Town
Frosts Athletic
Gorleston
Gothic
Great Yarmouth Town
Holt United
Ipswich Town
King's Lynn
Kirkley
Lakenheath
Leiston
Lowestoft Town
Mortons Athletic
North Walsham Athletic
North Walsham Town
Norwich CEYMS
Norwich City
Norwich City 'A'
Norwich Reserves
Norwich Electricity
Norwich Federation
Norwich St Barnabas
Norwich St James
Norwich YMCA
RAF Bircham Newton
RAF Feltwell
RAF Marham
Reepham Town
Sheringham
Sprowston Athletic
Swaffham Town
Thetford Recreation
Thetford Town
Thorpe Village
Wymondham Town

References

 
Football in Norfolk
Football in Suffolk
 
Defunct football leagues in England
1897 establishments in England
1964 disestablishments in England